The Prairie Street Historic District is located in Columbus, Wisconsin. It was added to the State Register of Historic Places in 1998 and to the National Register of Historic Places the following year.

References

Historic districts on the National Register of Historic Places in Wisconsin
National Register of Historic Places in Columbia County, Wisconsin